R&B Money is the tenth and final studio album by American R&B singer Tank. It was released on August 19, 2022 by Atlantic Records and his synergetic label R&B Money after which the album was titled. Prior to the release, Tank announced that R&B Money would be his final studio album, triggered in part by loss of hearing in his right ear in 2021.

Chart performance
R&B Money debuted and peaked at number 36 on the US Billboard Top Current Album Sales in the week of September 3, 2022. The same week, it also reached number 60 on the US Top Album Sales chart. The album became Tank's first project to reach neither the Billboard 200 nor the Top R&B/Hip-Hop Albums chart.

Track listing

Charts

Release history

References

2022 albums
Tank (American singer) albums
Atlantic Records albums